Cédric Gohy (born 16 February 1975) is a Belgian fencer. He competed in the individual foil event at the 2004 Summer Olympics.

References

External links
 

1975 births
Living people
Belgian male fencers
Belgian foil fencers
Olympic fencers of Belgium
Fencers at the 2004 Summer Olympics
People from Verviers
Sportspeople from Liège Province